Satrangi Sasural (international title: 7 Bridges to Cross) is a Hindi Indian soap opera, which was broadcast on Zee TV channel from December 2014 to March 2016. it replaced Aur Pyaar Ho Gaya in its timeslot. The show is an adaption of the Zee Marathi series Honar Sun Me Hya Gharchi. Satrangi Sasural is a story of love and marriage of Vihaan and Aarushi followed the journey of a beautiful middle-class girl Aarushi, who marries into a wealthy family in Delhi that consists of her husband Vihaan Vatsal and her seven mothers-in-law. 

The show originally starred Ravish Desai and Mugdha Chaphekar, The show is remembered for its launch and starcast which included actresses who played the seven mothers, with Farida Jalal playing Dadimaa (grandmother) and Ravish Desai, Mugdha Chaphekar who played the lead couple in season 1.

Plot

Season one 

Wealthy Vihaan Vatsal meets and falls in love with middle-class Aarushi, and brings her home to his seven "mothers" led by matriarch Dadi Maa. Aarushi sees through their tough exteriors and meets their demanding expectations while also forming a close bond with each of them.

Bua maa strikes Vibha with her car and Aarushi takes responsibility. Vibha's abusive husband demands a huge compensation but Vibha proclaims Aarushi's innocence and the family hire her as their house helper. However, Vibha forms an unhealthy attachment to Vihaan and burns the couple's passports to sabotage their honeymoon. The couple instead go to Mumbai where Vihaan proposed, and Vihaan disappears after being attacked by goons. Months later, on the day of Aarushi's baby shower, Vihaan returns with his "wife" Vibha. Vihaan had lost his memory and Vibha convinced him that she was his wife and Aarushi their maid. Threatening to turn Vihaan against them, Vibha makes the family follow her orders. Vihaan gradually becomes closer to Aarushi, especially when she gives birth to twins, a boy and a girl, but is confused by his feelings. He slowly regains his memories when Vibha tries to take him away from his family.

Vibha sells the family house, but realizes the buyer is Vihaan in disguise. Vibha gives Vihaan a poisoned kiss and demands that he legally marry her for the antidote. They are about to be married when Aarushi gives him the antidote instead. Vibha then takes their daughter hostage, blackmails the family, and burns their house. The family eventually reclaim the child. Aarushi stabs Vibha who shoots her, and Aarushi dies.

Season two

Four years later, a new girl, Kaira decides to marry Vihaan so she can receive her inheritance. They agree to separate after three months, a scheme by Bebo who is after the money. Although three of Vihaan's mothers despise her, Kaira grows close to the family. Kaira rescues Vihaan from Bebo's schemes, and Bebo dies while trying to control him with black magic.

Aarushi's long-lost sister Millie joins the family. Kaira tries to expose her as a witch but Millie's black magic stops her. The mothers convince the couple to marry properly but Millie causes misunderstandings. On the wedding day, Millie goes in Kaira's place but Kaira completes the ceremony. The mothers supporting Millie insist that she is also Vihaan's wife since he half-married her. Suspecting Millie is a witch, Kaira and Vihaan pursue her, and Vihaan vanishes. When Vihaan returns, he is rude to Kaira who believes he is an impostor. Kaira rescues the real Vihaan and Millie apologises. Kaira understands that Millie was forced in her actions, but Millie cannot identify who is responsible.

Dadi Maa overhears rumours that Kaira became pregnant by the impostor, offending Kaira who stays with Vasundhara. Vihaan sees a jewel at Vasundhara's home which he remembers from when he was under a spell. Dadi Maa performs a ritual to safeguard the family, but forgot the book in which Vihaan's fate was written. When she finds the book, Vihaan's secret fate had been torn out. The secret is that Vihaan's mother is actually Veena, Dadi Maa's eldest daughter-in-law who was banished for using black magic. Vihaan learns that Vasundhara, who also identifies as Veena and Mayavinni; regains her powers each month from the jewel. When the jewel glows in his hands he realizes that he is the witch's son. Vihaan meets Vasundhara in the forest and destroys the jewel, and she fatally attacks him. Kaira swears revenge.

Season three

One month after Vihaan's death, the family is celebrating Father's Day. Kaira provides gifts for the twins, making excuses for Vihaan's absence. Meanwhile, Vasundhara has lost her powers and realised that she killed her own son, and renews her determination to destroy all the Vatsals.

Kaira begins the traditional widow's grieving that Dadi Maa insisted upon, but later realizes that Dadi Maa is under Vasundhara's spell. Dadi Maa brings Vasundhara and her paralysed husband, Vihaan's father, into the home, against the wishes of Kaira and the other mothers. While causing a conflict, Vasundhara receives an electric shock and dies.

Meanwhile, the new neighbour, Bharat Bhusan Chautala,  BBC, expresses a romantic interest in Kaira. It is revealed that he is the long-lost son of Vihaan's adoptive mother, and heir of the Vastals. In the end, he proposes to Kaira who accepts.

Cast

Season one

 Ravish Desai as Vihaan Vatsal
 Mugdha Chaphekar as Aarushi Vihaan Vatsal. Aarushi dies in the last episode of season one
 Farida Jalal as Gomti Vatsal / Dadi Maa
 Samta Sagar as Geeta Vatsal 
 Bhavana Balsavar as Harpreet Vatsal  
 Sadiya Siddiqui as Priyanka Vatsal
 Resham Tipnis as Babita Vatsal 
 Sonali Sachdev as Narmada Vatsal
 Shital Thakkar as Neelima Tripathi
  Simpy Singh as Vibha Arvind Yadav / Vibha Vihaan Vatsal
  Pulkit Bangia as Girish Pandit 
  Sheikh Sami as Govind Pandit 
  Kanchan Gupta as Kasturi Pandit 
  Govind Pandey as Prahlaad Pandit 
  Tanvi Sawant as Millie Paandit 
 Alefia Kapadia as Karuna 
 Rakesh Kukreti as Gautam Tripathi 
 Rituraj Singh as Rajesh Vatsal
 Parveen Kaur as Diya's Mother
 Farhan Siddiqui as Raunak Punjabi

Season two 

 Ravish Desai as Vihaan Vatsal, he dies in the last episode of season two
 Vrushika Mehta as Kaira Vihaan Vatsal
 Farida Jalal as Gomti Vatsal / Dadi Maa
 Bhavana Balsavar as Harpreet Vatsal   
 Sadiya Siddiqui as Priyanka Vatsal 
 Resham Tipnis as Babita Vatsal 
 Sonali Sachdev as Narmada Vatsal 
 Shital Thakkar as Neelima Tripathi
 Divyangana Jain as Millie Pandit
 Maninee De as Vasundhara/Mayavini
 Vishavpreet Kaur as Bebo
 Yajuvendra Singh as Chetan Singh 
 Sushil Parashar as Yashwant Singh

Season three 

 Rahul Sharma as Bharat Bhushan Chautala 
 Vrushika Mehta as Kaira Bharat Bhushan Chautala
 Manini Mishra as Vasundhara/Mayavini
 Farida Jalal as Gomti Vatsal / Dadi Maa
 Bhavana Balsavar as Harpreet Vatsal / Chachi Maa
 Sadiya Siddiqui as Priyanka Vatsal  / Bua Maa
 Resham Tipnis as Babita Vatsal / Mini Maa
 Sonali Sachdev as Narmada Vatsal/maa
 Shital Thakkar as Neelima Tripathi / Massi Maa
 Samta Sagar as Geeta Vatsal  / Tai Maa

Awards and nominations

Adaptations

References

External links
Official website

2014 Indian television series debuts
Indian television soap operas
Zee TV original programming